The 1951–52 Serie C was the fourteenth edition of Serie C, the third highest league in the Italian football league system.

FIGC reduced the number of teams to form only one girone.

Regular season

Girone A

Girone B

Girone C

Girone D

Play-off

Promotion

Relegation

Serie C seasons
3
Italy